The Hyundai New Super Aero City (hangul:현대 뉴슈퍼에어로시티) is a heavy-duty single-decker bus manufactured by the truck & bus division of Hyundai. It was introduced in 1991. It primarily used as a city bus and an intercity bus as either a complete bus or a bus chassis. It is distinguishable by a front 'Aero City' badge, but the common Hyundai badge is usually on the rear. The model's principal competitors is the Daewoo BS106 Royal City, but it also competed against the now-discontinued Kia AM bus series (originally Asia AM).

First Generation (CY) 1991–2000
The Aero City was launched as the successor to Hyundai RB, it is built on the Mitsubishi Fuso Aero Star chassis until 1994.

Aero City 520L
The 520L was produced from 1991 to 1994 with the wheelbase of 20cm shorter than the Aero City 540.

Aero City 520SL
The 520SL is produced from 1991 until 1995 with low ground clearance than the 520 and 520L.

Aero City 540

The 540 became available from 1991 to 2000 as a Intercity/City bus, in late 1997  the 280 horsepower D6AB was available.

Aero City 540L
The 540L is the same as the 540 with D6AB engine and an 8-pin Front and Rear wheel design.

Aero City 540SL

The 540SL is Low Ground Clearance than the 540 and 540L.

Super Aero City (2000-2008)
The Super Aero City was launched in 2000 as successor to the Aero City 540/540L/540SL with three engine options, the diesel version is powered by D6AB still producing 280 horsepower and the Naturally Aspirated D6AV producing 235 horsepower, while the CNG version is powered by C6AB producing 290 horsepower.

Super Aero City L
The Super Aero City L has the interior elements from the Aero City 540L.

Super Aero City SL

Like the Super Aero City L, the Super Aero City SL has the interior elements from the Aero City 540SL, the Super Aero City SL  is only offered in Diesel powertrain.

New Super Aero City (November 2004-January 2008)

The New Super Aero City was launched in 2005 and it is offered in Diesel or CNG.

New Super Aero City L

The New Super Aero City L has integrated rear lamps and protective partitions installed in the driver's seat.

New Super Aero City SL

The Super Aero City SL is produced between December 2004 to early 2006 with a lot of interior and exterior changes such as integrated rear lamps, fixed driver's side view mirror.

New Super Aero City Low Floor

The Low Floor version of the Super Aero City was launched in 2005, CNG and automatic transmission is standard.

New Super Aero City F/L (February 2008-Present)

The New Super Aero City was launched in 2005 with its facelift similar to the Hyundai Universe. The CD type audio system and MP3 player was added in 2010, the air suspension is now added as an option in 2012, in 2015 the Inline-six H310 Euro 6 Diesel engine is introduced.

New Super Aero City F/L Low Floor
The Hyundai New Super Aero City F/L CNG Low Floor Bus Handicapped Allison or ZF entry, manufactured since 2008.

Models
The Aero City was built on the Mitsubishi Fuso bus chassis until 1994, when Hyundai created its own bus chassis. The Aero City has been produced under many different names.

Current models
New Super Aero City F/L (restyled): manufactured since late 2007. Also available in L model.
New Super Aero City low floor F/L (restyled): long wheelbase with handicapped entry, manufactured since 2008; uses Allison or ZF transmission.
UniCity: a variant of the New Super Aero City F/L with coach elements. Manufactured since late 2011.
GreenCity: a shorter variant of the New Super Aero City F/L.
ElecCity: Electric bus variant with Pure electric and Fuel Cell, in production since 2017.

TC Motor
In 2023 Vietnam,  The First Bus as the Hyundai New Super Aero City F/L CNG and sold as the Hyundai TC Motor New Super Aero City F/L CNG First Run Bus Since 2023 CNG Brand New Bus CNG F/L TC Motor.

Past models
Aero City 520/540: built on the Mitsubishi Fuso Aero Star chassis from 1991 to 1994.
Aero City 520/540/540L/540SL (new model): built on Hyundai's own chassis, manufactured from 1994 to 2001. Also available in L and SL models (L and SL models have a slightly lower decked floor).
Super Aero City: manufactured from 2000 to 2004. Also available in L and SL models.
Super Aero City low floor: long wheelbase with handicapped entry, manufactured in 2004; uses Allison or ZF transmission.
New Super Aero City: manufactured from 2005 to 2007. Also available in L model.
New Super Aero City low floor: long wheelbase with handicapped entry, manufactured from 2005 to 2008; uses Allison or ZF transmission.
Global 900: a shorter version of the Super Aero City and New Super Aero City.
BlueCity: Manufactured from 2011 to 2020. a CNG-electric hybrid variant of the New Super Aero City low floor F/L.

See also

Hyundai Motor Company
Hyundai Aero
Hyundai Global 900
Hyundai RB
 List of buses

Vehicles introduced in 1991
Rear-wheel-drive vehicles
Hybrid electric buses
Low-floor buses
Low-entry buses
Bus chassis
Buses of South Korea
Hyundai buses